Scopula cuneilinea is a moth of the  family Geometridae. It is found in Asia, including India, Pakistan, Bangladesh and Thailand.

Adults are attracted to the eyes of ox and other cattle for their lachrymal secretion.

The larvae are serious defoliators of Anthocephalus cadamba, but have also been recorded feeding on Adina species.

References

Moths described in 1863
cuneilinea
Moths of Asia